Battus (means "tongue-tied") was a figure in Greek mythology who witnessed Hermes stealing Apollo's cattle in Maenalus in Arcadia.

Hermes gave him a heifer on condition Battus kept the theft secret. On returning in disguise, Hermes offered to reward Battus if he would tell him the location of the cattle; Battus did so, and for his greed was punished by being turned into stone.

Notes

References 
 Graves, Robert, The Greek Myths, Harmondsworth, London, England, Penguin Books, 1960. 
 Graves, Robert, The Greek Myths: The Complete and Definitive Edition. Penguin Books Limited. 2017. 
 Grimal, Pierre, The Dictionary of Classical Mythology, Wiley-Blackwell, 1996. 

Characters in Greek mythology
Metamorphoses characters
Deeds of Hermes
Metamorphoses into inanimate objects in Greek mythology